The Millionaire Pirate is a 1919 American silent fantasy adventure film directed by Rupert Julian and starring Monroe Salisbury, Ruth Clifford and Lillian Langdon.

Cast
 Monroe Salisbury as Jean Lafitte
 Ruth Clifford as The Girl
 Lillian Langdon as Her Mother
 Harry Holden as Her Father
 Jack Mower as Her Sweetheart
 Clyde Fillmore as Robert Spurr

References

Bibliography
 Robert B. Connelly. The Silents: Silent Feature Films, 1910-36, Volume 40, Issue 2. December Press, 1998.

External links
 

1919 films
1919 adventure films
American silent feature films
American adventure films
American black-and-white films
Universal Pictures films
Films directed by Rupert Julian
1910s English-language films
1910s American films
Silent adventure films